Jonathan D. Mackie is a New Hampshire politician.

Mackie graduated from Oyster River High School.

On November 6, 2018, Mackie was elected to the New Hampshire House of Representatives where he represents the Belknap 2 district. Mackie assumed office on December 5, 2018. Mackie is a Republican.

Mackie is married and has two children.

Mackie resides in Meredith, New Hampshire, and has done so since 1984.

References

Living people
People from Meredith, New Hampshire
Republican Party members of the New Hampshire House of Representatives
21st-century American politicians
Year of birth missing (living people)